Nuclear-interacting partner of ALK (NIPA), also known as zinc finger C3HC-type protein 1 (ZC3HC1), is a protein that in humans is encoded by the ZC3HC1 gene on chromosome 7. It is ubiquitously expressed in many tissues and cell types though exclusively expressed in the nuclear subcellular location. NIPA is a skp1 cullin F-box (SCF)-type ubiquitin E3 ligase (SCFNIPA) complex protein involved in regulating entry into mitosis. The ZC3HC1 gene also contains one of 27 SNPs associated with increased risk of coronary artery disease.

Structure

Gene 
The ZC3HC1 gene resides on chromosome 7 at the band 7q32.2 and includes 14 exons.

Protein 
NIPA is a 60-kDa E3 ligase that contains one C3HC-type zinc finger and one F-box-like region. Moreover, a 50-residue region (amino acids 352-402) at its C-terminal serves as the nuclear translocation signal (NLS sequence) while a 96-residue region (amino acids 306-402) is proposed to serve as the phosphotyrosine-binding domain. NIPA is one component of the nuclear SCFNIPA complex, and phosphorylation of NIPA at three serine residues, Ser-354, Ser-359 and Ser-395, has been demonstrated to inactivate the complex as a whole.

Function 

NIPA is broadly expressed in the human tissues, with the highest expression in heart, skeletal muscle, and testis. It is a human F-box protein that defines an SCF-type ubiquitin E3 ligase, the formation of which is regulated by cell-cycle-dependent phosphorylation of NIPA. Cyclin B1, essential in the entry into mitosis, is targeted by SCFNIPA in interphase. Phosphorylation of NIPA occurs in G2 phase, results in dissociation of NIPA from the SCF core, and has been proven critical for proper G2/M transition.  Oscillating ubiquitination of nuclear cyclin B1 driven by the SCFNIPA complex contributes to the timing of mitotic entry. NIPA is also reported to delay apoptosis and the localization of NIPA is required for this antiapoptotic function.

Model organisms 

Model organisms have been used in the study of ZC3HC1 function. A conditional knockout mouse line, called Zc3hc1tm1a(KOMP)Wtsi was generated as part of the International Knockout Mouse Consortium program — a high-throughput mutagenesis project to generate and distribute animal models of disease to interested scientists.

Male and female animals underwent a standardized phenotypic screen to determine the effects of deletion. Twenty two tests were carried out on mutant mice and eleven significant abnormalities were observed. Fewer than expected homozygous mutant mice were identified at weaning. Mutants appear to be subfertile, had decreased vertical activity in an open field, decreased lean body mass, decreased rib number and decreased mature B cell number. Males also had a decreased body weight, an abnormal posture and atypical indirect calorimetry data. Females also had an abnormally short snout and atypical haematology parameters .

Clinical relevance 
In humans, NIPA has been implicated in cardiovascular diseases by genome-wide association (GWAS) studies. Specifically, a single-nucleotide polymorphism (SNP) situated in ZC3HC1 has been shown to predict coronary artery disease. This prediction appears to be independent of traditional risk factors for cardiovascular disease such as high cholesterol levels, high blood pressure, obesity, smoking and diabetes mellitus, which are primary targets of current treatments for coronary artery disease. Therefore, studying the function of this gene may identify novel pathways contributing to coronary artery disease that result in the development of novel therapeutics.

Clinical marker 
At the coronary artery disease-associated locus 7q32.2, only a single SNP (rs11556924) is associated with coronary artery disease risk, with no other variants in strong linkage disequilibrium. The rs11556924 SNP in the ZC3HC1 gene results in an arginine-histidine polymorphism at amino acid residue 363 in NIPA. Furthermore, rs11556924 has also been associated with altered carotid intima-media thickness in patients with rheumatoid arthritis and with altered risk of atrial fibrillation.

Additionally, a multi-locus genetic risk score study based on a combination of 27 loci, including the ZC3HC1 gene, identified individuals at increased risk for both incident and recurrent coronary artery disease events, as well as an enhanced clinical benefit from statin therapy. The study was based on  a community cohort study (the Malmo Diet and Cancer study) and four additional randomized controlled trials of primary prevention cohorts (JUPITER and ASCOT) and secondary prevention cohorts (CARE and PROVE IT-TIMI 22).

References

Further reading 

 
 
 
 
 
 
 
 
 

Genes mutated in mice